"Hey Little One", a song written by Dorsey Burnette and Barry De Vorzon, was initially recorded by Dorsey, released on May 2, 1960 on the Era label as the double A-side "Hey Little One"/"Big Rock Candy Mountain" (Era 3019). "Hey Little One" reached number 48 on the Billboard Hot 100 chart.
Musicians on the recording include veteran session drummer Earl Palmer.

Glen Campbell version
American country-pop music artist Glen Campbell covered the song for his Grammy-winning 1967 LP By the Time I Get to Phoenix and released it as the second single from the album. Campbell's more grandiose version reached number 13 on Billboard's Hot Country Singles chart  and in February 1968 peaked at 54 on the Hot 100. The single also reached the Top Ten on the RPM Country Tracks chart in Canada. Campbell's follow-up LP Hey Little One, released in March 1968 just four months after its predecessor, also featured the track.

Chart performance

References

1968 songs
1968 singles
Glen Campbell songs
Capitol Records singles
Songs written by Dorsey Burnette
Song recordings produced by Al De Lory
Songs written by Barry De Vorzon